A Munkászubbony (English: The Work Jacket) is a 1915 Hungarian silent film. It is one of the oldest Hungarian films in existence and one of the longest Hungarian silent films. It was previously presumed lost but was rediscovered in 2017. It will be sent to the Hungarian National Film Archives' collection, where it will be restored and digitalized.

See also
 List of rediscovered films

References

External links
 

1915 films
Hungarian silent films
Hungarian black-and-white films
1910s rediscovered films
1915 Austro-Hungarian films
Hungarian drama films
1915 drama films
Rediscovered Hungarian films
Austro-Hungarian films
Silent drama films